Eupithecia lvovskyi is a moth in the family Geometridae. It is found in Russia.

References

Moths described in 1988
lvovskyi
Moths of Asia